Tenuazonic acid is a mycotoxin produced by Alternaria species. It is a powerful eukaryotic protein synthesis inhibitor. It is a tetrameric acid that is ubiquitous in biological environments and prevents the release of newly synthesized protein from the ribosome. Its toxicity is the highest among all Alternaria mycotoxins and has both phytotoxic and cytotoxic properties. In 1991 Tenuazonic acid was reported to inhibit skin tumor promotion in mice.

Inhibitory properties 
Tenuazonic acid (TeA) is a potent phytotoxin and an effective bio-herbicide due to its ability to block the photosynthetic pathway. It specifically plays an inhibitory role in photosystem II (PSII) by blocking the flow of electrons from QA to QB. Studies aimed to determine the exact binding site of TeA in photosystem II found that it binds to the QB site, preventing QA from transferring its electrons to QB. Chlorophyll fluorescence study of the croftonweed plant treated by TeA in vivo show a time dependent increase of reduced QA as electron transfer is halted. This resulted in decreased photosynthesis in vivo. Tenuazonic acid also resulted in inactivation of PSII QA and QB reaction centers. Understanding this inhibitory mechanism of tenuazonic acid in photosynthesis allows for creation of new herbicides which are more targeted and less lethal to the environment.

Tenuazonic acid has been a compound of interest in drug development research for Alzheimer's disease (AD). Several factors contribute to the onset of AD, including low levels of the neurotransmitter acetylcholine (Ach), heightened production of free radicals, and reactive oxygen species (ROS) that cause increased oxidative stress. A drug for AD must target multiple factors of the disease to have a successful therapeutic effect. One study examining six natural compounds determined tenuazonic acid to be a viable compound to treat this multi-factorial disease due to its anti-oxidative and acetylcholinesterase inhibiting properties. Acetylcholinesterase inhibitors (AChEIs) inhibit the breakdown of acetylcholine — allowing for prolonged action of acetylcholine in the nervous system. Tenuazonic acid was also observed to have the ability to chelate heavy metals that directly contribute to increasing oxidative stress.) Five derivatives of tenuazonic acid synthesized and tested for effectiveness in AD treatment showed multi-target activity. Hybrids created using TeA and a known AD drug exhibit even better acetylcholinesterase inhibiting activity.

References 

Pyrrolidones
Ketones
Mycotoxins
Enols